H. James Palmer (August 26, 1851 – December 22, 1939) was the 11th premier of Prince Edward Island  and the son of former colonial Premier Edward Palmer.

Born in Charlottetown, Palmer was educated at Prince of Wales College and then at King's College in Windsor, Nova Scotia.

He was called to the bar in 1876 and became a Queen's Counsel in 1878. Palmer entered the provincial legislature as a Liberal upon winning a seat in the election of 1900. He served as Attorney-General at various times except between 1904 and 1908 when he was out of office. In May 1911 he became premier when Francis Longworth Haszard was appointed to the Supreme Court of the province. At the time, members of the legislature who became Premier were required to resign their seats and run for re-election in a by-election. Palmer did so but was defeated in the December by-election. He resigned as premier and returned to his law practice. The loss of Palmer's seat also caused the Liberal government to lose their majority in the legislature and the lieutenant governor asked the leader of the opposition, John A. Mathieson, to form a new government.

References 
 H. James Palmer, Premiers Gallery, Government of Prince Edward Island
 H. James Palmer papers, Prince Edward Island Archival Information Network

1851 births
1939 deaths
People from Charlottetown
Canadian Anglicans
Premiers of Prince Edward Island
Prince Edward Island Liberal Party MLAs
Prince Edward Island Liberal Party leaders
Prince of Wales College alumni
University of King's College alumni
Canadian King's Counsel